Merciless means a lack of mercy, leniency or compassion.

Merciless may also refer to:

Music
 Merciless (band), a Swedish metal band
 Merciless (DJ), Jamaican dancehall DJ Leonard Bartley (born 1971)
 Merciless (album), a 1983 album by Stephanie Mills
 Merciless (EP), a 1994 EP by Godflesh
 Merciless, a 2003 album by Merciless
 Merciless, a 2005 album by Most Precious Blood
 The Merciless, a 2004 album by Aura Noir

Other uses
The Merciless, a 2017 South Korean crime-action film 
 "Merciless", nickname of Ray Mercer (born 1961), American retired boxer, kickboxer and mixed martial artist

See also
 Ming the Merciless, the main villain in the Flash Gordon comic strip and related works
 Mordru the Merciless, the villain in the DC Comics story arc of the same name